Mark Gregory Pais (born June 3, 1991) is an American soccer player who plays as a goalkeeper.

Career

College
Pais began his college career at Saint Louis University in 2009, before transferring in his senior year to the University of Tulsa.

After college, Pais played with USL PDL club Des Moines Menace during the 2013 season.

Professional
Pais signed with USL club Saint Louis FC on January 15, 2015.

Honors

Club
Toronto FC
MLS Cup: 2017

Miami FC
NPSL National Championship: 2019
NISA East Coast Championship: 2019

References

External links

Tulsa bio
Saint Louis Billikens bio

1991 births
Living people
American soccer players
Saint Louis Billikens men's soccer players
Tulsa Golden Hurricane men's soccer players
Des Moines Menace players
Saint Louis FC players
Toronto FC II players
Toronto FC players
Fresno FC players
Miami FC players
Association football goalkeepers
Soccer players from Missouri
USL Championship players
USL League Two players
National Independent Soccer Association players